Les Milles is a 1995 French drama film directed by Sébastien Grall.

Cast 
 Jean-Pierre Marielle – Commandant Perrochon
 Philippe Noiret – Général
 Kristin Scott Thomas – Mary–Jane Cooper
 Rüdiger Vogler – Feuchtwanger
 Ticky Holgado – Capitaine Moinard
 François Berléand – Lieutenant Boisset
 François Perrot – Colonel Maurice Charvet
 Jean-Marie Winling – Médecin-chef Garraud

References

External links 

 

1990s war drama films
Films set in 1940
French war drama films
Western Front of World War II films
World War II prisoner of war films
1995 drama films
1995 films
1990s French films